The Stratfield Historic District is a historic residential area on the west side of Bridgeport, Connecticut. In the late 19th and early 20th century, it was one of the highest-status and most fashionable neighborhoods in the city. It was listed on the National Register of Historic Places in 1980.

Description and history
The Stratfield area is located on Bridgeport's west side, and is a roughly north–south district centered at the junction of North Avenue (United States Route 1), Clinton Avenue, and Brooklawn Avenue (Connecticut Route 59).  It extends eastward in several places, including a complete city block bounded by Clinton, North, Laurel, and Beechwood Avenues.  The area is mostly residential, with only six churches as exceptions.  The majority of homes were built here between 1880 and 1920, in popular revival styles of the period.  Earlier buildings include a Federal period house that was given a Queen Anne makeover in the late 19th century, and two Italianate houses dating to the 1850s, when the area was divided into country estates.  The area also has some of the city's oldest surviving early history, in a small park that was once the site of a colonial militia training ground.

Bridgeport's economy grew rapidly in the second half of the 19th century, and earlier fashionable districts were overtaken by increasing urbanization.  The Stratfield area was developed piecemeal by multiple developers, and was desirable for its balance between distance and proximity to the city's expanding urban core to the east.

See also

History of Bridgeport, Connecticut
National Register of Historic Places listings in Bridgeport, Connecticut

References

Geography of Bridgeport, Connecticut
Historic districts in Fairfield County, Connecticut
National Register of Historic Places in Fairfield County, Connecticut
Historic districts on the National Register of Historic Places in Connecticut